Kejimkujik National Park is a National Park of Canada, covering  in the southwest of Nova Scotia peninsula. Located within three municipalities, Annapolis, Queens, Digby, it consists of two separate land areas: an inland part, which is coincident with the Kejimkujik National Historic Site of Canada, and the Kejimkujik National Park Seaside on the Atlantic coast.

The Historic site is a cultural landscape  forested upland plain between the South Shore and the Annapolis Valley. In it is found petroglyph sites, habitation sites, fishing and hunting sites, travel routes and burial grounds, which attest to Mi’kmaq occupancy of this area for thousands of years.

The seaside part is a wilderness protection area featuring coastal bogs, beaches, intertidal areas, and abundant flora and fauna.

The Royal Astronomical Society of Canada has designated the park a dark-sky preserve.

The park is named after Kejimikujik Lake, the largest lake in the park.

History
Canoe routes in the park have been used for thousands of years by native peoples to travel from the Bay of Fundy to the Atlantic shore.

There are four Mi'kmaw petroglyph sites in the park. They are found in slate beds on the eastern side of Kejimikujik Lake. There are no slates beds on the western side. They are highly protected. Only one site can be visited by the public via a guided tour in the summer. The petroglyphs show aspects of Mi'kmaw life after European contact, and are dated to the 1700s and 1800s. Many are symbolic and sometimes ambiguous. Motifs associated with traditional culture include canoes, wigwams, traditional costume, and decorative designs. There are also images of prey animals, but none of plants. European motifs include ships, horses, women in dresses, Christian symbols, and five-pointed stars.

The Tent Dwellers is a book by Albert Paine which chronicles his travels through inland Nova Scotia on a trout fishing trip. Published in 1908, it takes place in what is now Kejimkujik National Park and the Kejimkujik Seaside Tobeatic Game Reserve.

Recreation
The main Jeremy's Bay campground has 355 campsites, many suitable for large RVs, and generates about $1 million per year in fees. A group campground for up to 80 people is at Jim Charles Point, named after the eponymous local First Nations Guide who lived there in the mid-1800s. There are also backcountry primitive campsites accessible by canoe, bicycle or hiking.

There are 15 hiking trails for hiking, skiing, or snowshoeing. Backcountry campsites can also be accessed on foot. Winter camping is possible. Activities such as bird-watching and night sky viewing are also available in the park.

Flora
Most of the park's forest is second growth, although it does contain significant areas of intact original habitat. The park is situated in the Southwest Nova Biosphere Reserve in a region characterized as Acadian forest. There are 23 species of ferns that are found in the park. Common ferns include cinnamon fern, bracken fern, and New York fern. Rare ferns such as oak fern, dwarf chain fern, bog fern, and curly-grass fern are also protected in the park. Wildflowers bloom from May through June and common species include blue violet, star-flower, rose twisted-stalk, twin-flower, painted trillium, and goldthread. There are 544 species of vascular plants in the park and 15 species of orchids including Common lady’s-slipper and Rattlesnake plantain.

Fauna
Among the 34 species of mammal found in the park, the more common are: shrews, the star-nosed mole, bats, snowshoe hare, squirrels (including nocturnal flying squirrels), beaver (protected species in Nova Scotia), mice, voles, porcupine, red fox, and white-tailed deer. The park's shallow lakes, bogs, and marshes are a habitat to a greater variety of amphibians and reptiles than anywhere else in Atlantic Canada. 

Common birds of the park include hermit thrush, white-breasted nuthatch, American woodcock, northern parula, yellow-bellied sapsucker, piping plover (at the seaside), ruffed grouse, common loon, barred owl, and the American black duck.

At the Kejimkujik seaside, harbor seals can be seen. The Little Port Joli Basin and Basin Lake are being used for European green crab research. The removal of the green crabs is essential in research into the dwindling fish stocks on the East Coast.

Invasive species include the chain pickerel and the small-mouth bass.

The park is habitat to many endangered or threatened species, including the Blanding's turtle, ribbon snake, piping plover, Canada warbler, common nighthawk, chimney swift, monarch butterfly, and harlequin duck.

Common loons in the park have the highest levels of methyl mercury in their blood of any loons in North America, the result of bioaccumulation. This is reducing their reproduction rates. After years of research, the ultimate source of the mercury remains unknown. Mercury is present in many fish across Nova Scotia, and there are province-wide advisories on all species, except rainbow trout.

The federal government Kejimkujik Ecological Research and Monitoring Centre has run dozens of projects in the park.

Geography

The park is located in a flat plain. Precambrian to Ordovician quartzite and slate form the bedrock, along with Devonian granite. These rocks provide few nutrients to the soils that develop from them. Podzols are found in well-drained areas, which poorly-drained areas are dominated by Gleysols and peat bog.

Fifteen percent of the park is covered by lakes. Evidence of the Last Glacial Period include drumlins, erratics, and eskers. Major rivers include the Mersey, and the Shelburne, major lakes include Kejimikujik, and Luxton.

Kejimujik National Park Seaside includes white sandy beaches and coastal wetland areas. It also has boulder fields and drumlins formed by glacial action.

Climate
The park has a humid continental climate (Köppen climate classification Dfb) with four distinct seasons. Being located inland, in the western part of Nova Scotia, the park has warmer temperatures and higher precipitation than eastern sections of Nova Scotia. During this time of the year, the maximum temperature often stays below freezing although frequent mild spells push maximum temperatures above freezing frequently (about 12–19 days from December to February) and occasionally above  when the wind is from the southwest. On average, there are 8 days where the temperature falls below . Winters are characterized by stretches of unsettled weather, resulting in high precipitation and cloud cover. Snowfall is high, averaging  a year.

Temperatures in the park rarely exceed , occurring on 2 days per year owing to the moderating influence of the ocean. Spring and fall are transitional seasons that feature mild temperature although they are unpredictable. The park receives  of precipitation per year, which is fairly evenly distributed throughout the year.

Trails
Mersey Meadow: Easy, Linear, 70 metres one way
Mill Falls: Easy, Linear, 2 kilometres return
Beech Grove: Moderate, Loop, 2.2 kilometres
Flowing Waters: Easy, Loop 1 kilometre
Hemlocks and Hardwoods: Moderate, Loop, 5 kilometres
Farmlands: Moderate, Loop, 1.1 kilometres
Rogers Brook: Easy, Loop, 1 kilometres
Grafton Woods: Easy, Loop, 1,6 kilometres
Snake Lake: Moderate, Loop, 3 kilometres
Gold Mines: Moderate, Linear, 1.5 kilometres one way
Peter Point: Moderate, Linear, 1.9 kilometres one way
Mersey River: Easy, Linear, 3.5 kilometres one way
Slapfoot: Moderate, Linear, 3.2 kilometres one way
Jake's Landing to Merrymakedge Beach: Moderate, Linear, 3 kilometres one way
Ukem'k: Moderate, Linear, 6.3 kilometres one way
Eel Weir to Fire Tower: Moderate, Linear, 19.5 kilometres return
Channel Lake: Difficult, Loop, 24 kilometres
Liberty Lake: Difficult, Linear, 60.5 kilometres

See also

List of National Parks of Canada
List of parks in Nova Scotia

References

External links

National parks in Nova Scotia
Tourist attractions in Annapolis County, Nova Scotia
Tourist attractions in Digby County, Nova Scotia
Region of Queens Municipality
Protected areas established in 1968
Geography of Annapolis County, Nova Scotia
Geography of Digby County, Nova Scotia
Geography of Queens County, Nova Scotia
Tourist attractions in Queens County, Nova Scotia
National Historic Sites in Nova Scotia
Dark-sky preserves in Canada
Canada geography articles needing translation from French Wikipedia